"Super" is a song by American rapper Cordae, released on October 7, 2021 as the lead single from his second studio album From a Birds Eye View (2022). It was produced by Kid Culture, Jenius and Uriah.

Composition
In the song, Cordae raps about his recent successes, such as earning $7 million in 2020 without doing a show, starring in a Coca-Cola commercial for the Super Bowl LIV, and his friendship with Twitter CEO Jack Dorsey. He also shouts out to Dr. Dre (mentioning his then-upcoming performance at the Super Bowl LVI halftime show), boasts about his crew and designer clothes, and explains that he left YBN due to a lack of ownership.

Music video
The music video was directed by Arrad and released alongside the single. In it, Cordae stands atop a skyscraper at night, plays the roles of the CEO of "Cordae Cola" and a schoolteacher, prepares to be executed via guillotine surrounded by a large crowd, and rides through a city.

Charts

References

2021 singles
2021 songs
Cordae songs
Atlantic Records singles